The Sourdough Inn, at First and Sled Streets in Fort Yukon, Alaska, was built in 1926, by moving a disused Army building from Fort Egbert near Eagle, Alaska. It was then modified and opened as a hotel. It has also been known as the New Sourdough Hotel and has served as a restaurant, a hotel, a post office and, briefly in the 1940s, as a school.

The building was listed on the National Register of Historic Places in 1997. Following its NRHP listing, it was the only frame building and the only hotel in the community of Fort Yukon.

The building no longer stands at its original location, which was in an area subjected to heavy floods. It is unclear whether it was destroyed or relocated elsewhere in Fort Yukon.

See also
 National Register of Historic Places listings in Yukon–Koyukuk Census Area, Alaska

Notes

References

1926 establishments in Alaska
Hotel buildings completed in 1926
Buildings and structures on the National Register of Historic Places in Yukon–Koyukuk Census Area, Alaska
Fort Yukon, Alaska
Hotel buildings on the National Register of Historic Places in Alaska
Post office buildings on the National Register of Historic Places in Alaska
Restaurants in Alaska
School buildings on the National Register of Historic Places in Alaska
Schools in Unorganized Borough, Alaska